Ravi Gulati (born 1974) is an Indian social activist. He gives after school tuitions to the underprivileged in New Delhi.

Early life
Ravi Gulati is born in New Delhi to Indira, an NGO worker. He graduated with an MBA from IIM, Ahmedabad.

Career
Ravi Gulati began his corporate career in Canada only to give up eight months later. He returned to pursue a hands-on course in Environment Education from CEE, Ahmedabad. He was then involved with Trees for Life (later HIMCON), an NGO working with rural Himalayan communities. He is a board member of Jansamarth, an NGO working in remote Himalayan villages for generating electricity through micro-hydro power plants for lighting and livelihoods.

Manzil
Ravi Gulati took to teaching children of drivers, barbers and maids near his home in New Delhi's Khan Market. He wanted to work in the villages but stayed back in Delhi because two poor children needed tuitions from him. While he taught them he realised what he was doing was equally important in urban India as what he would have done in rural India.

He started an NGO, Manzil, along with his mother and Dr. Geeta Chopra. The organisation has a branch at Kotla, a slum area in Delhi.

References

External links
 Manzil
 A Blog on Ravi Gulati
 Profile
 Ravi Gulati's talk - Education and Social change

Social workers
20th-century Indian educational theorists
Living people
1974 births
Social workers from Delhi